Mary Caruthers Scales (September 24, 1928 – October 6, 2013) was a professor, civic leader, and funeral home owner. She was the first black faculty member at Middle Tennessee State University where she taught in the College of Education, and became associate dean there.  Prior to this she had been a school teacher at Bradley and Bellwood schools. She was later elected to the Murfreesboro City School Board, and to the Murfreeboro City Council as the first African-American female councilperson.[subscription] Scales Elementary School in Murfreesboro, Tennessee is named in honor of  her and her husband, Robert W. Scales. Her husband, Robert W. Scales was the first African-American elected to the Murfreesboro City Council and first African-American Vice-Mayor of the city.

Life and career
Mary Scales was born in Columbus, Georgia, and raised in Chicago, Illinois.

Mary Scales attended Knoxville College, received her bachelor's degree from Tennessee State University, and her Master's from Middle Tennessee State University.
 
Mary Scales began her career as a school teacher, and supervisor of instruction in middle school math at Bradley & Boxwood middle schools. She then worked in the Murfreesboro City Schools Administration before being hired at MTSU's education department as an associate professor then full professor as the first black faculty member at MTSU. She would later go on to become association dean of continuing education, and a math specialist with the Tennessee Department of Education.

Mary Scales a founding member of the Pi Nu Omega and served as advisor to Eta Psi chapter of Alpha Kappa Alpha at Middle Tennessee State University. She was married to Robert "T-90" Scales, owner of the Scales & Sons Funeral Home and the first black city councilperson and vice-mayor of Murfreesboro, Tennessee. She was later herself elected to the Murfreesboro City School Board, and Murfreesboro City Council as the first black woman ever elected. After the passing of Robert "T-Niny" Scales she took over ownership of the Scales & Sons Funeral Home from 2000 to 2012.

Her daughter, Madelyn Scales Harris, was elected to the Murfreesboro City Council in 2010.

References

1928 births
2013 deaths
African-American academics
African-American schoolteachers
Schoolteachers from Tennessee
African-American women in politics
Middle Tennessee State University alumni
Middle Tennessee State University faculty
People from Columbus, Georgia
People from Murfreesboro, Tennessee
School board members in Tennessee
Tennessee State University alumni
Women city councillors in Tennessee
American women academics
20th-century African-American people
21st-century African-American people
20th-century African-American women
21st-century African-American women